Harold Valentine Ross Robertson  (born 22 May 1949), known as Ross Robertson, is a New Zealand politician for the Labour Party. He was a Member of Parliament from  until his retirement in 2014. He also served as president of Parliamentarians for Global Action.

Early life
Robertson was born in Wellington on 22 May 1949. Before entering politics, he was an industrial engineer.

Political career

Member of Parliament

Robertson was first elected to Parliament in the 1987 election, representing Papatoetoe replacing the retiring Eddie Isbey. He would hold the seat until the 1996 elections, when the Papatoetoe seat was abolished. That same year, Robertson was then elected to represent the replacement seat of Manukau East. In November 1990 he was appointed as Labour's spokesperson for Energy and Statistics by Labour leader Mike Moore.

In the Fifth Labour Government of New Zealand he was an assistant speaker, able to preside when any of the other presiding officers are unavailable.

In 2006 Robertson reported to the New Zealand Police that a marijuana dealer was operating next to his electorate office in Ōtara.

In 2013, Robertson voted against the Marriage Amendment Bill, which aimed to permit same-sex marriage in New Zealand, with fellow Labour MPs William Sio, Rino Tirikatene and Damien O'Connor.

On 6 June 2013, Robertson announced that he would retire from Parliament in order to pursue a career in local-body politics.

Robertson was appointed a Companion of the Queen's Service Order, for services as a Member of Parliament, in the 2015 New Year Honours.

Local-body politics
Robertson was elected to the Ōtara-Papatoetoe Local Board in the 2013 Auckland elections and was re-elected in 2016 and 2019.

References

1949 births
Living people
New Zealand Labour Party MPs
Members of the New Zealand House of Representatives
New Zealand MPs for Auckland electorates
Companions of the Queen's Service Order
21st-century New Zealand politicians
Local politicians in New Zealand
New Zealand justices of the peace